Giovanni Domenico Santorini (June 6, 1681 – May 7, 1737) was an Italian anatomist. He was a native of Venice, earning his medical doctorate at Pisa in 1701. He is remembered for conducting anatomical dissections of the human body.

From 1705 until 1728, Santorini performed anatomical demonstrations in Venice. His best written work was the 1724 publication of Observationes anatomicae, a detailed work involving anatomical aspects of the human body. He is credited for providing descriptions of several anatomical structures, including the following:
 Santorini's cartilage:  The corniculate cartilage of the larynx.
 Santorini's concha: The supreme nasal concha (turbinate).
 Duct of Santorini: An accessory duct of the pancreas.
 Santorini's fissures: Vertical fissures in the anterior part of the cartilage of the external acoustic meatus (ear canal).
 Santorini's minor caruncle: Location of the opening of the accessory pancreatic duct into the duodenum.
 Santorini's muscle: Bundle of muscular fibers that draw the angle of the mouth laterally. Sometimes called the Albinus muscle; named after German anatomist Bernhard Siegfried Albinus (1697–1770).
 Santorini's vein: Vein which passes through the parietal foramen and links the superior sagittal sinus with veins of the scalp.
 Santorini's plexus: plexus of veins found in the Cave of Retzius (retropubic space), see prostatic venous plexus.

References 

 Giovanni Santorini @ Who Named It

1681 births
1737 deaths
Italian anatomists
Physicians from Venice
18th-century Venetian people